The 2009 Barclays Dubai Tennis Championships was a 500 Series event on the 2009 ATP World Tour and a Premier 5 event on the 2009 WTA Tour. Both of the events took place at The Aviation Club Tennis Centre in Dubai, United Arab Emirates. The women's tournament took place from 15 to 21 February 2009, while the men's tournament will take
from 23 to 28 February 2009.

The men's draw was led by only 3 of the world's Top 10 men: ATP No. 3 Novak Djokovic, Doha, Rotterdam champion Andy Murray and ATP No. 8 Gilles Simon.
Australian Open runner-up and four-time champion Roger Federer was scheduled to take part, however he was forced to withdraw from the tournament due to a back injury. ATP No. 1, Rotterdam finalist, 2006 titlist & recent Australian Open champion Rafael Nadal was also due to compete but was also forced to withdraw from the event due to a knee injury sustained at the previous event in Rotterdam. Defending champion Andy Roddick withdrew from the event due to the Shahar Pe'er incident and chose not to defend his title as a protest. Nikolay Davydenko and Fernando Verdasco were also scheduled to play but withdrew due to injuries.

In the women's event, nine of the ten highest ranked players participated. The top four seeds were Serena Williams, the 2009 Australian Open champion, Dinara Safina, the 2009 Australian Open runner-up, Jelena Janković, a former World No. 1, and Elena Dementieva, the runner-up at the recent Open GDF SUEZ tournament in Paris. Also in the field were Vera Zvonareva, a 2009 Australian Open semifinalist and winner of the recent Pattaya Women's Open, Venus Williams, the reigning Wimbledon champion, Svetlana Kuznetsova, and Ana Ivanovic.

Shahar Pe'er controversy

The tournament became embroiled in controversy when the Dubai government refused to grant a visa to Israeli player Shahar Pe'er, denying her the ability to take part in the 2009 Dubai Tennis Championships.  The refusal to allow Pe'er to participate drew immense criticism from top seed players. WTA chief executive Larry Scott said the women's tour was "deeply disappointed" by the decision. "Ms. Pe'er has earned the right to play in the tournament and it's regrettable that the UAE is denying her this right", he said. "Ms. Peer and her family are obviously extremely upset and disappointed by the decision of the UAE and its impact on her personally and professionally." Scott said the WTA would "review appropriate future actions with regard to the future of the Dubai tournament". In reaction to the move, the Tennis Channel decided not to televise the event, and The Wall Street Journal dropped its sponsorship. In response to the move by the UAE, the Dubai Tennis Championship was fined a record US$300,000.  Pe'er was awarded US$44,250, an amount equal to the average prize money she earned per tournament in 2008. A number of highly ranked tennis players, including 2008 winner Andy Roddick, pulled out of the men's ATP tournament in Dubai in protest. Roger Federer and Rafael Nadal also pulled out of the tournament, although they both cited injury as their reason for withdrawal, not the incident involving Pe'er.  The WTA Tour Board also demanded that Dubai organizers confirm that qualifying Israeli players will get visas at least eight weeks in advance for the 2010 event.

WTA entrants

Seeds

Rankings as of 16 February 2009.

Other entrants
The following players received wildcards into the main draw:

 Sania Mirza
 Vera Dushevina
 Stefanie Vögele

The following players received entry from the qualifying draw:

 Anastasia Rodionova
 Urszula Radwańska
 Anna Lapushchenkova
 Julia Schruff
 Elena Vesnina
 Viktoriya Kutuzova
 Tamira Paszek
 Yan Zi

The following players received the lucky loser spots:
 Ayumi Morita
 Andreja Klepač
 Camille Pin

ATP entrants

Seeds

Rankings as of 23 February 2009.

Other entrants
The following players received wildcards into the main draw:
 Marat Safin
 Andreas Seppi
 Mohammed Ghareeb
The following players received entry from the qualifying draw:
 Flavio Cipolla
 Laurent Recouderc
 Marco Chiudinelli
 Michael Lammer
The following player received the lucky loser spot:
 Rik de Voest

Finals

Men's singles

 Novak Djokovic defeated  David Ferrer 7–5, 6–3
 It was Djokovic's first title of the year and 12th of his career.

Women's singles

 Venus Williams defeated  Virginie Razzano 6–4, 6–2
It was Venus' first title of the year and 40th of her career.

Men's doubles

 Rik de Voest /  Dmitry Tursunov defeated  Martin Damm /  Robert Lindstedt 4–6, 6–3, [10–5]

Women's doubles

 Cara Black /  Liezel Huber defeated  Maria Kirilenko /  Agnieszka Radwańska 6–3, 6–3

References

External links
 Official website

 
2009
Dubai Tennis Championships
Dubai Tennis Championships